is a masculine Japanese given name.

Possible writings
Osamu can be written using different kanji characters and can mean:
治 "reign"
修 "discipline"
理 "logic"
収 "obtain"
紀 "chronicle"
統 "rule"
The name can also be written in hiragana or katakana.

People with the name
, Japanese baseball player and coach
, Japanese rower
Osamu Adachi (理, born 1987), Japanese actor and a member of the acting group D-BOYS
, Japanese manga artist
Osamu Dazai (太宰 治, 1909–1948), Japanese author
Osamu Dezaki (統, 1943-2011), Japanese anime director
Osamu Fukutani (修, born 1967), Japanese film director
, Japanese television personality
, Japanese long-distance runner
Osamu Jinguuji (治), drummer of the Japanese band Remioromen
, Japanese rower
Osamu Matsuda or El Samurai (納, born 1966), a Japanese professional wrestler
Osamu Mukai (理, born 1982), Japanese actor
Osamu Muramatsu (修), Japanese astronomer, and a prolific discoverer of asteroids
Osamu Nagayama (born 1947), Japanese CEO of Chugai Pharmaceutical  and Chairman of Sony Corporation
, Japanese shogi player
Osamu Noguchi
, Japanese sport shooter
, Japanese rower
, Japanese actor and voice actor
Osamu Sato (理, born 1960), Japanese artist, photographer and composer
Osamu Sato (boxer) (修, born 1976), Japanese boxer
, Japanese organic chemist and marine biologist
, Japanese economist
, Japanese comedian and television presenter
, Japanese cyclist
, Japanese alpine skier
Osamu Tezuka (治虫, 1928–1989), Japanese manga artist often credited as the "Father of Manga"
, Japanese swimmer
, Japanese freestyle skier
, Japanese freestyle skier

Fictional characters
Osamu Kamiyama (治), a character in the anime series Kamisama Kazoku
Osamu Kimizuka, a character in the shōnen-ai manga Loveless
Osamu Mikumo (修), a character in the anime and manga World Trigger
Osamu Miya (宮治), a character in the manga Haikyū!! with the position of wing spiker from Inarizaki High and the twin brother of Atsumu Miya
Osamu Dazai (治), a character in the anime and manga Bungou Stray Dogs
Osamu Kashiwagi (柏木 修), a character in the video game series Yakuza

See also
11930 Osamu, a main-belt asteroid 
"Osamu's Birthday", a 1967 song on The United States of America's album Hard Coming Love

Japanese masculine given names